The 1990 Big South Conference baseball tournament  was the postseason baseball tournament for the Big South Conference, held from May 12 through 15 at Charles Watson Stadium home field of Coastal Carolina in Conway, South Carolina.  All seven teams participated in the double-elimination tournament.  For the first time, the Tournament champion received an automatic bid to the 1990 NCAA Division I baseball tournament.   won the championship for the second time.

Format
All seven teams qualified for the tournament, with the regular season champion receiving a single bye.  The final was winner take all, regardless of the number of losses.

Bracket and results

Game results

All-Tournament Team

Most Valuable Player
Chris Wagner was named Tournament Most Valuable Player.  Wagner was a pitcher for Campbell.

References

Tournament
Big South Conference Baseball Tournament
Big South baseball tournament
Big South Conference baseball tournament